The 1967–68 Dallas Chaparrals season was the first season of the Chaparrals in the American Basketball Association. The Chaps fell to the New Orleans Buccaneers in the Division Finals after beating the Houston Mavericks in the Semifinals. That playoff victory would be their only victory for the Chaparrals as they fell in the Semifinals for the next four years, before they moved to San Antonio.

Roster
 24 Charles Beasley - Shooting guard
 44 John Beasley - Center
 20 Jim Burns - Shooting guard 
 -- Mike Dabich - Center
 16 Cliff Hagan - Small forward
 15/20 Dennis Holman - Point guard
 25 Carroll Hooser - Power forward
 31 Riney Lochmann - Small forward
 43 Elton McGriff - Center
 12 Maurice McHartley - Point guard
 33 Rich Peek - Center
 35 Cincy Powell - Small forward
 14 Rubin Russell - Guard
 11 Bob Verga - Shooting guard
 12 Gene Wiley - Center
 22 Bobby Wilson - Power forward

Final standings

Western Division

Record vs. opponents

Playoffs
Western Division Semifinals

Chaparrals win series 3–0

Western Division Finals

Chaparrals lose series 4–1

Awards and honors
1968 ABA All-Star Game selections (game played on January 9, 1968)
 Cliff Hagan
 John Beasley

References

External links
 Chaparrals on Basketball Reference
 RememberTheABA.com 1967–68 regular season and playoff results
 RememberTheABA.com Dallas Chaparrals page

Dallas Chaparrals
Dallas
Dallas Chaparrals, 1967-68
Dallas Chaparrals, 1967-68